Louis Abrahams (1852 – 2 December 1903) was a British-born Australian tobacconist, art patron, painter and etcher associated with the Heidelberg School art movement, also known as Australian Impressionism.

Early life
Born in London, England, Abrahams arrived in Melbourne, Victoria, Australia, as an eight-year-old with his family in 1860.

Career and association with the Heidelberg School
Later that decade, Abrahams attended the Artisans School of Design in Carlton, where he met Frederick McCubbin. The pair formed a close friendship and later enrolled at the National Gallery of Victoria Art School in 1871, where they founded a club to study the nude. McCubbin named his first son Louis after Abrahams, who reciprocated by naming his son Frederick. Both artists, along with fellow National Gallery student Tom Roberts, established the Box Hill artists' camp in 1885. Later accompanied by Arthur Streeton, Charles Conder and others, the group sought to capture the Australian bush by painting it en plein air.

By the time the group relocated to Mount Eagle estate (Eaglemont) near Heidelberg in 1888, Abrahams had less time for art due to the demands of the family cigar business. He still made trips to visit his friends at Eaglemont, and supplied them with many cigar-box lids for painting impressions. 183 of these cigar-box paintings were exhibited by Roberts, Streeton and Conder in the landmark 9 by 5 Impression Exhibition of 1889.

Abrahams sat for some of McCubbin's best-known paintings, including Down on His Luck (1889) and A Bush Burial (1890), and he is the subject of portraits by McCubbin, Roberts, Streeton, Julian Ashton, John Mather and others. Due to his financial support of the Australian impressionists, Abrahams, along with his brother and business partner Lawrence, is regarded as an important patron of early Australian art.

Death and legacy
Abrahams suffered from depression and committed suicide on 2 December 1903. His body was found in a basement toilet at his factory, "with a bullet wound in the head and a revolver clenched in both hands".

Abrahams' personal art collection was passed down to his grandson, architect Sir Denys Lasdun, best-known for designing the Royal National Theatre complex on London's South Bank.

Abrahams Crescent in the Canberra suburb of Conder is named in his honour.

Gallery

References

External links

Louis Abrahams at the National Gallery of Victoria

1852 births
1903 suicides
Heidelberg School
Australian Jews
Australian tobacconists
19th-century Australian painters
19th-century Australian male artists
20th-century Australian painters
20th-century Australian male artists
Suicides by firearm in Victoria (Australia)
1903 deaths
Australian male painters
Artists from Melbourne
English emigrants to colonial Australia